Personal and Ubiquitous Computing is a peer-reviewed scientific journal that was established in 1997. It covers original research on ubiquitous and pervasive computing, ambient intelligence, and wearable and mobile information devices, with a focus on user experience and interaction design issues. The journal publishes a mixture of issues themed on specific topics, or organised around scientific workshops, and original research papers.

The editor-in-chief is Peter Thomas. The journal is published by Springer Nature.

Abstracting and indexing 
The journal is abstracted and indexed in Academic OneFile, Academic Search, Compendex, Computer Science Index, Current Abstracts, Current Contents/Engineering, Computing and Technology, Digital Bibliography & Library Project, Ergonomics Abstracts, Inspec, io-port.net, Science Citation Index Expanded, and Scopus.

According to Journal Citation Reports, the journal has a 2020 impact factor of 3.06.

References

External links 
 

English-language journals
Ubiquitous computing
Computer science journals
Bimonthly journals
Springer Science+Business Media academic journals
Publications established in 1997